Cassipora is an indigenous village of Lokono Amerindians in the resort of Carolina in the Para District in Suriname. The village is located near the Blaka Watra recreation area. It is also near a 17th-century Jewish village, however only the cemetery remains.

History
Cassipora is located near a former Jewish settlement which was established in 1665, and abandoned twenty years later in favour of neighbouring Jodensavanne. During the 19th century, the wood plantation Salem was located at the site. The village contains small clusters of houses occupied by one family which are spaced far apart.

Cassipora is connected to the water supply, and since 2016, to the electricity grid. The village has mobile phone access. For schooling and health care, it is depended on neighbouring Redi Doti, which can be reached by an unpaved road. There is a conflict with logging companies who also use the road.

The village chief since 2011, is Muriël Fernandes who was first elected at the age of 29. The economy is based on subsistence farming, hunting and tourism. Since 2002, the village is owner of the Blaka Watra resort.

Blaka Watra
Blaka Watra is a creek with very dark, near black water. Former Prime minister Johan Adolf Pengel built his country residence near the creek. Artificial rapids were constructed in the creek to give the impression of a bubble bath. In 1970, after his death, it was turned into a public recreation area. During the Surinamese Interior War it was the scene of heavy fighting. It has been restored, and regained its status as a recreation area.

Cassipora Cemetery

In 1671, a synagogue was built in Cassipora, however all traces of the building have disappeared, and only the graves remain. Together with Jodensavanne, the cemetery is on the tentative list for the Unesco World Heritage List since 1998. During World War II, the Jodensavanne internment camp was established to intern political prisoners from the Dutch East Indies. One of the tasks of the prisoners was clearing the forest, and repairing the graves at Cassipora. The cemetery contains several hundred graves, and the oldest dates from 1667.

References

Historic Jewish communities in South America
Indigenous villages in Suriname
Jewish Surinamese history
Populated places in Para District
Tourist attractions in Suriname